The Portuguese Basketball League Cup (Taça da Liga) is a competition for Portuguese teams that play in LPB. It was played by the clubs of the former LCB, which was a professional league. After the LCB folded in 2008, the League Cup ended as well. In the 2009–10 season, the competition was restarted as Hugo dos Santos Cup (Taça Hugo dos Santos), in honor of the former president of the Portuguese Basketball Federation.

League Cup winners

Performance by club

External links

Cup, Portuguese Basketball
Cup
Basketball league cup competitions in Europe
Recurring sporting events established in 1989
1989 establishments in Portugal